The history of sculpture in the United States begins in the 1600s "with the modest efforts of craftsmen who adorned gravestones, Bible boxes, and various utilitarian objects with simple low-relief decorations." American sculpture in its many forms, genres and guises has continuously contributed to the cultural landscape of world art into the 21st century.

Folk art
There is frequently art in well-made tombstones, iron products, furniture, toys, and tools—perhaps better reflecting the character of a people than sculptures made in classical styles for social elites. One of these specific applications, the carving of wooden figureheads for ships, started in the Americas as early as 1750 and a century later helped launch the careers of Samuel McIntyre and the country's first famous sculptor, William Rush (1756–1833) of Philadelphia.  The tradition begun then continues today in the folk sculpture style known as Chainsaw carving.

The Italian years
In the 1830s, the first generation of notable American sculptors studied and lived in Italy, particularly in Florence and Rome, creating the Neoclassic style. At that time, Italy "provided the proper atmosphere, brought the sculptor close to the great monuments of antiquity, and provided museum collections that were available to study." They also gave the artists access to the carvers of Italy who translated their clay works into marble. During this period the themes from which the subjects of sculptural works were chosen tended to be drawn from antiquity, the exceptions being portraits (whose subjects were frequently shown wearing Roman or Greek garb) or works that included Native Americans.  These artists included Horatio Greenough (1805–1852), Hiram Powers (1805–1873), Thomas Crawford (1814–1857), Thomas Ball (1819–1911) and his son-in-law William Couper (1853–1942), Harriet Hosmer (1830–1908), Chauncey Ives (1810–1894), Randolph Rogers (1825–1892) and (somewhat later) William Henry Rinehart (1825–1874).

19th-century American women sculptors

American women also became active sculptors during the Italian Period despite the sexism of the age. Among the women who acquired both commissions and fame were Edmonia Lewis, Harriet Hosmer, Anne Whitney, Vinnie Ream and Emma Stebbins).

The Paris years

In the decades following the Civil War American sculptors began more and more to go to Paris to study — falling in with the more naturalistic and dramatic style exemplified by the works of Jean-Baptiste Carpeaux (1827–1875) and Antoine-Louis Barye (1796–1875) and other French sculptors.  Among these Americans were Augustus Saint-Gaudens, Frederick MacMonnies, and Daniel Chester French.

Home grown

American sculpture of the mid- to late 19th century was often classical and often romantic, but it showed a special bent for a dramatic, narrative, almost journalistic realism (especially appropriate for nationalistic themes) as witnessed by the frontier life depicted by Frederic Remington. This was the beginning of the style of "Western Art" that continued with Alexander Phimister Proctor and others through the 20th into the 21st century.

Animal sculptors (Animaliers)

The naturalism of the French school, exemplified by Antoine Barye, had a great impact on the first sculptors of American wildlife.  The first generation of American animaliers included, Edward Kemeys, Edward Potter (who occasionally worked with Daniel Chester French, producing horses for his equestrian statues), Alexander Phimister Proctor (who executed mounts for Augustus Saint-Gaudens' riders), Charles Russell, Herbert Haseltine, Frederick Roth, Albert Laessle and Anna Hyatt Huntington.

Public monuments
The years following the American Civil War saw a huge increase in the number of public monuments erected in the United States.  "By far the most prevalent monument features a fully equipped Confederate soldier (the same prototype held true for Union monuments) in a realistic pose."
This style of monument was popularized by sculptor Martin Milmore who created one of the first ones in 1868.  Milmore's own monument, authored by Daniel Chester French, Death and the Sculptor remains one of America's "noble tributes."

As the century closed, the pace of monument-building quickened in the great cities of the East, especially those erected to memorialize the Civil War. Several outstanding sculptors emerged, most of them trained in the beaux-arts academies of Paris. Daniel Chester French stands out, as do Frederick William Macmonnies, Hans Schuler, and Lorado Taft. This tradition continued to the 1940s with Charles Keck, Alexander Stirling Calder and others and the use of figurative sculpture in monuments persists into the 21st Century.  After the middle of the 20th Century sculpture used in public monuments was increasingly abstract.

The decades following the Second World War saw a large number of monuments and memorials dedicated to the victims of the Holocaust.

Carving mountains
There are at least three major mountain sculptures in the United States.  These are Mount Rushmore, Stone Mountain, and Crazy Horse Memorial. Gutzon Borglum, an accomplished sculptor with such pieces as Seated Lincoln and a variety of other public monuments, oversaw the sculpture of Mount Rushmore in the Black Hills in South Dakota.  The monument was finished after his death by his son Lincoln Borglum.

Gutzon Borglum also was responsible for starting the Stone Mountain project in Georgia but had a falling-out with its overseers.  The monument was then taken up by Augustus Lukeman, who died during its carving in 1935.  The memorial was finished by Walker Hancock and was considered complete in 1972.

The Crazy Horse Memorial in the Black Hills of South Dakota depicts the Oglala Lakota warrior Crazy Horse riding a horse and pointing into the distance.  It was begun in 1948 by sculptor Korczak Ziolkowski and continued after his death by his wife, Ruth Ziolkowski, who took over the helm of the project, and several of their children.  The face was dedicated in 1998.

Architectural sculpture

Public buildings of the last quarter of the 19th century and the first half of the 20th century provided an architectural setting for sculpture, especially in relief. Karl Bitter, Lee Lawrie, Adolph Alexander Weinman, C. Paul Jennewein, Rene Paul Chambellan, Corrado Parducci, and many others worked in the simple, sometimes narrative style that fit these spaces.  Much of this work was created by anonymous sculptors and carvers.

Twentieth century

As the century began, many young European sculptors migrated to the free, booming economy across the Atlantic, and European trained sculptors account for much of the great work created before 1950.  These include Elie Nadelman, Albin Polasek, Gaston Lachaise and Carl Milles.

Modern Classicism

Several notable American sculptors joined in the revitalization of the classical tradition at this time, most notably Paul Manship, who "discovered" archaic Greek sculpture while studying on a scholarship in Rome. C. Paul Jennewein and Edward McCartan were also leaders in this direction who fit easily with the art-deco tastes of the 1920s.
In the 1930s and 1940s, the ideologies that rent European politics were reflected in associations of American sculptors. On the right was the group, mostly native-born, mostly old-school classical, mostly modelers of clay, who founded the National Sculpture Society, led by the heiress and sculptor Anna Hyatt Huntington and preserved in the sculpture park that she endowed — Brookgreen Gardens in South Carolina.

American Expressionism

On the left, often immigrant, often expressionistic, was the New York-based Sculptors Guild, with an emphasis on more current themes and direct carving in wood or stone. One of its better known members was William Zorach.

African-American sculptors

With the Harlem Renaissance, an African-American sculpture genre emerged. Richmond Barthé was an outstanding example. Augusta Savage was a sculptor and teacher. Richard Hunt was the first to have a retrospective show at the Museum of Modern Art in 1971. Other contemporary sculptors include Elizabeth Catlett, Martin Puryear, Jerry Harris, and Thaddeus Mosley.

Turn toward abstraction

Some Americans, such as Isamu Noguchi, had already moved from figurative to nonfigurative design, but after 1950, the entire American art world took a dramatic turn away from the former tradition, and America led the rest of the world into a more iconoclastic and theoretical approach to modernism.

Within the next ten years, traditional sculpture education would almost completely be replaced by a Bauhaus-influenced concern for abstract design. To accompany the triumph of abstract expressionist painting, heroes of abstract sculpture such as David Smith emerged, and many new materials were explored for sculptural expression. Louise Nevelson pioneered the emerging genre of environmental sculpture.

However, during this period a group of American sculptors persisted in creating works in their pre-war, modern/classical-style. These include Milton Horn, Donal Hord, Charles Umlauf, Joseph Erhardy, and John Henry Waddell.

Gallery of Modernist American sculpture

Pushing the boundaries of art

The figure returned in the 1960s, but without the beaux-arts figurative tradition, sometimes even as life-casts like those George Segal made with plaster. Jim Gary created life-sized figures composed of metal washers and hardware almost invisibly welded together, as well as those of stained glass and even used automobile parts and tools in his sculptures.

Concerns for the qualities of forms and design continued — but usually without representing a human figure. Minimalist sculpture by artists such as Richard Serra and Norman Carlberg often replaced the figure in public settings. Sculpture of the late 20th century was mostly a playful exploration of the boundaries of what could be called art.

Minimalism

The Minimalist style reduces sculpture to its most essential and fundamental features. Minimalists include Tony Smith, Donald Judd, Robert Morris, Larry Bell, Anne Truitt, and Dan Flavin;

Site-specific movement

Site specific and environmental art works are represented by artists: Donald Judd, Dennis Oppenheim, Richard Serra, Robert Irwin, George Rickey, and Christo and Jeanne-Claude led contemporary abstract sculpture in new directions. Artists created environmental sculpture on expansive sites in the 'land art in the American West' group of projects. These land art or 'earth art' environmental scale sculpture works exemplified by artists such as Robert Smithson, Michael Heizer, James Turrell (Roden Crater) and others
The land art (earth art) environmental scale sculpture works by Robert Smithson, Michael Heizer, James Turrell and others.

Postminimalism

Artists Bill Bollinger, Eva Hesse, Sol LeWitt, Jackie Winsor, Keith Sonnier, Bruce Nauman, and Lucas Samaras, among others were pioneers of Postminimalist sculpture. The later works of Robert Graham continued evolving, often in public art settings, into the 21st century.

Also during the 1960s and 1970s artists as diverse as Stephen Antonakis, Chryssa, Walter De Maria, Dan Flavin, Robert Smithson, Dennis Oppenheim, Robert Irwin, Claes Oldenburg, George Segal, Edward Kienholz, Duane Hanson, and John DeAndrea explored abstraction, imagery and figuration through Light sculpture, Land art, and installation art in new ways.

Late 20th-century revival of figurative sculpture

Other kinds of sculpture grew in importance, some evolving from the work of leaders in ironwork during the early 1900s who included Samuel Yellin. A center for the western style of American sculpture developed at Loveland, Colorado, and many studios, magazines, and even a museum (the National Cowboy & Western Heritage Museum in Oklahoma City) pursued this interest. A neo-Victorian style emerged, pioneered by the sculptor Frederick Hart.

Other genres of sculpture

The art-doll and ceramic sculpture communities also grew in numbers and importance in the late 20th century, while the entertainment industry required large-scale, spectacular (sometimes monstrous or cartoon-like) sculpture for movie sets, theme parks, casinos, and athletic stadiums. Industrial product design, especially automobiles, should not be ignored.  An example is Randolph Parducci's (brother of Corrado Parducci) sculptures created for the famous chariot race scene in the film Ben Hur.

Legal issues regarding photographs

United States courts have consistently held that sculptors maintain an intellectual property right to sculptures and are entitled to compensation if photographs are used for commercial purposes.  The rights apply even if the sculptor no longer owns the sculpture or the sculpture is not even in a public space.  The sculptor, however, could sign away those rights.  Some other countries, such as Germany, give permission to take the photographs via the concept of Panoramafreiheit, or Freedom of Panorama.

On February 25, 2010, the United States Court of Appeals for the Federal Circuit ruled 2-1 that the Frank Gaylord, sculptor of the Korean War Veterans Memorial, was entitled to compensation because an image of it was used on a 37 cent U. S. postage stamp and he had not signed away his intellectual property rights.  The appeals court rejected arguments that the photo was transformative.

In 2002, amateur photographer and retired Marine John All was paid $1,500 to use one of his photographs of the memorial on a snowy day for the stamp which sold more than $17 million worth of stamps.  In 2006, sculptor Frank Gaylord enlisted Fish & Richardson to make a pro bono claim that the U. S. Postal Service had violated his intellectual property rights to the sculpture and thus he should have been compensated.  The Postal Service argued that Gaylord was not the sole sculptor (saying he had received advice from federal sources – who recommended that the uniforms appear more in the wind) and also that the sculpture was actually architecture.  Gaylord won all of his arguments in the lower court except for one...the court ruled the photo was fair use and thus he was not entitled to compensation.  Gaylord appealed the fair use ruling and won the case on appeal. On April 22, 2011, The US Court of Claims awarded Gaylord $5,000.

See also
 History of sculpture

Notes

References
 Armstrong, Craven, et al., 200 Years of American Sculpture, Whitney Museum of Art, NYC, 1976
 Caffin, Charles H., American Masters of Sculpture, Doubleday, Page & Company, New York 1913
 Conner, Janis and Joel Rosenkranz, Rediscoveries in American Sculpture, Studio Works 1893–1939, University of Texas, Austin, Texas 1989
 Contemporary American Sculpture, The California Palace of the Legion of Honor, Lincoln Park, San Francisco, The National Sculpture Society 1929
 Craven, Wayne, Sculpture in America, Thomas Y. Crowell Co, NY, NY 1968
 DeWall, Robb, Crazy Horse and Korczak: The Story of an Epic Mountain Carving, Illustrations by Marinka Ziolkowski, Korczak's Heritage, Inc.  Crazy Horse, SD,  1982
 Falk, Peter Hastings, Editor, Who Was Who in American Art, Sound View Press, Madison Connecticut, 1985
 Fort, Ilene Susan, The Figure in American Sculpture: A Question of Modernity, Los Angeles County Museum of Art & University of Washington Press, Los Angeles, CA 1995
 Gadzinski, Susan James and Mary Mullen Cunningham, American Sculpture in the Museum of American Art of the Pennsylvania Academy of Fine Arts, Museum of American Art of the Pennsylvania Academy of Fine Arts Philadelphia 1997
 Greenthal, Kozol, Rameirez & Fairbanks, American Figurative Sculpture in the Museum of Fine Arts, Boston, Museum of Fine Arts, Boston 1986
 Gridley, Marion E., America’s Indian Statues, Marion E. Gridley, Chicago, Illinois 1966
 Kvaran, Einar Einarsson, Architectural Sculpture in America, unpublished manuscript
 McSpadden, J. Walker, Famous Sculptors of America, Dodd, Mead and Company, Inc. New York 1924
 Navarra, Tova, Jim Gary: His Life and Art, HFN, New York 1987
 Opitz, Glenn B, Editor, Mantle Fielding’s Dictionary of American Painters, Sculptors & Engravers, Apollo Book, Poughkeepsie NY, 1986
 Proske, Beatrice Gilman, Brookgreen Gardens Sculpture, Brookgreen Gardens, South Carolina, 1968
 Reynalds, Donald Martin, Masters of American Sculpture: The Figurative Tradition From the American Renaissance to the Millennium, Abbeville Press, NY 1993
 Rubenstein, Charlotte Streifer, American Women Sculptors, G.K. Hall & Co., Boston 1990
 Smith, Rex Allen, The Carving of Mount Rushmore, Abbeville Press, New York 1985
 Taft, Lorado, The History of American Sculpture, MacMillan Co., New York, NY 1925

External links
 20th Century American Figure sculpture